Edward Wilson may refer to:

Ed Wilson (artist) (1925–1996), African American sculptor
Ed Wilson (baseball) (1875–?), American baseball player
Ed Wilson (singer) (1945–2010), Brazilian singer-songwriter
Ed Wilson, American television executive
Ed Wilson, Australian jazz musician, co-leader of Daly-Wilson Big Band
Edward Wilson, clergyman and the founder of Wilson's School, originally in Camberwell, London
E. O. Wilson (born Edward Osborne Wilson, 1929–2021), American entomologist and biologist
Edward "Tug" Wilson (1921–2009), founder and first commander of the Abu Dhabi Defence Force
Edward Adrian Wilson (1872–1912), English Antarctic explorer
Edward E. Wilson (1867–1952), African American lawyer
Edward Junior Wilson (born 1984), Liberian footballer
Edward L. Wilson (born 1931), American civil engineer
Edward Livingston Wilson (1838–1903), American photographer, writer and publisher
Edward Wilson (MP) (1719–1764), English MP for Westmorland
Edward Wilson (actor) (1947–2008), English actor and theatre director
Edward Wilson (engineer) (1820–1877), railway engineer in England
Edward Wilson (journalist) (1813–1878), 19th-century Australian journalist
Edward Wilson (novelist), 21st century British writer of spy novels
Edward Francis Wilson (1844–1915), Canadian Anglican missionary and clergyman
Edward Pellew Wilson Jr. (1832–1899), British-Brazilian businessman
Tay Wilson (Tennant Edward Wilson, 1925–2014), member of the International Olympic Committee from New Zealand
Edward H. C. Wilson (1820–1870), Justice of the Michigan Supreme Court

Fictional character
Edward Wilson, the character played by Matt Damon in The Good Shepherd

See also
Eddie Wilson (disambiguation)
Edmund Wilson (disambiguation)
Edwin Wilson (disambiguation)
Ted Wilson (disambiguation)